Mao Biao (born July 24, 1987 in Tianjin) is a Chinese footballer who plays as a striker. He is ridiculed by local fans who usually address him with nickname Cristiano Maonalbiao (Chinese:克里斯蒂亚诺·毛纳尔彪) or C Mao (Chinese:C毛).

Club career
A graduate of the Tianjin Teda youth team Mao Biao broke into the senior team in the opening game of the 2005 league season against Liaoning Zhongyu, where he also scored his debut goal in a 5-1 win. Throughout the season Mao Biao found himself gaining significant playing time, though often coming on as a substitute he was nevertheless able to play in fifteen league games by the end of the season. This was to continue throughout the following season where he was able to further his reputation at Tianjin by playing in twenty-two league games.

Mao Biao, however did not rise to prominence until the 2008 league season when he was able to strike a partnership with Éber Luís Cucchi that saw Tianjin come fourth in the league and a chance to play in the AFC Champions League. At the 2009 AFC Champions League he played in six games and scored one goal as the team were knocked out in the group stages, while back within the league he was unable to replicate the same success he achieved with Éber Luís Cucchi.

International career
Mao Biao made his international debut against Saudi Arabia on June 4, 2009 in a 4-1 loss coming on as a substitute for Gao Lin.

Honours
Chinese FA Cup: 2011

References

External links
 
 
 Player profile at sohu.com
 Player profile at sina.com

1987 births
Living people
Chinese footballers
Footballers from Tianjin
China international footballers
Tianjin Jinmen Tiger F.C. players
Chinese Super League players
Association football forwards
Association football wingers